Sandor (Shony) Alex Braun (Cristuru-Secuiesc, Romania, 14 July 1930 – Los Angeles, 4 October 2002) was a Hungarian (Romanian born) violinist, Holocaust survivor, classical composer and actor. He also played bit parts in the TV shows Perry Mason, WKRP in Cincinnati and the film '68. He died of pneumonia on 4 October 2002.

Early life

Shony Alex Braun was a violin prodigy. He was arrested at age 13 and was sent to the Auschwitz concentration camp, where he would regularly play the violin for SS officers in exchange for extra food rations. After the Holocaust he resumed his violin studies.  He emigrated to the United States in 1950.

References

Sources
Shony Alex Braun
Shony Alex Braun with Emily Cavins, My Heart is a Violin, 1st Books, 2002

1932 births
2002 deaths
Deaths from pneumonia in California
Jewish concentration camp survivors
Romanian violinists
Hungarian classical violinists
Male classical violinists
Jewish violinists
Mozarteum University Salzburg alumni
Hungarian Jews
Romanian Jews
American people of Hungarian-Jewish descent
20th-century classical violinists
Romanian emigrants to the United States
20th-century Hungarian male musicians